Caner Toptaş (born 14 August 2001) is a Turkish weightlifter. He won the silver medal in the 62 kg event at the 2018 Summer Youth Olympics held in Buenos Aires, Argentina.

At the 2017 European Junior & U23 Weightlifting Championships held in Durrës, Albania, he won the silver medal in the men's 56 kg event. In 2019, he won the gold medal in the men's 61 kg event at the Junior World Weightlifting Championships held in Suva, Fiji.

References

External links 
 

Living people
2001 births
Place of birth missing (living people)
Turkish male weightlifters
Weightlifters at the 2018 Summer Youth Olympics
21st-century Turkish people